Donovan Anthony Matthews (born 29 October 1971) is a Guyanese-born cricketer who played for the Turks and Caicos Islands. Matthews was a right-handed batsman who fielded as a wicket-keeper.

Matthews played a single Twenty20 match for the Turks and Caicos Islands against Montserrat in the 2008 Stanford 20/20 at the Stanford Cricket Ground.  He top scored in the Turks and Caicos Islands of 67 runs, scoring 25 runs before he was run out by Shernyl Burns.  Montserrat went on to win the match by 9 wickets.

References

External links

1976 births
Living people
Sportspeople from Georgetown, Guyana
Turks and Caicos Islands cricketers